Pomadasys is a genus of grunts native to the waters of the eastern Atlantic Ocean and through the Indian Ocean to the Pacific coast of the Americas. The name of this genus is a compound of poma meaning "lid" or "covering" and dasys meaning "rough", a reference to the serrated preopercle.

Species
There are currently 34 recognized species in this genus:
 Pomadasys aheneus McKay & J. E. Randall, 1995 (Yellowback grunt)
 Pomadasys andamanensis McKay & Satapoomin, 1994
 Pomadasys argenteus (Forsskål, 1775) (Silver grunt)
 Pomadasys argyreus (Valenciennes, 1833) (Bluecheek silver grunt)
 Pomadasys auritus (G. Cuvier, 1830) (Longhead grunt)
 Pomadasys bayanus D. S. Jordan & Evermann, 1898 (Purplemouth grunt)
 Pomadasys bipunctatus Kner, 1898
 Pomadasys branickii (Steindachner, 1879) (Sand grunt)
 Pomadasys commersonnii (Lacépède, 1801) (Smallspotted grunter)
 Pomadasys crocro (G. Cuvier, 1830) (Burro grunt)
 Pomadasys empherus W. A. Bussing, 1993 (Bigspine grunt)
 Pomadasys furcatus (Bloch & J. G. Schneider, 1801) (Banded grunter)
 Pomadasys guoraca (G. Cuvier, 1829)
 Pomadasys incisus (S. Bowdich, 1825) (Bastard grunt)
 Pomadasys jubelini (G. Cuvier, 1830) (Sompat grunt)
 Pomadasys kaakan (G. Cuvier, 1830) (Javelin grunter)
 Pomadasys laurentino (J. L. B. Smith, 1953) (Manylined grunter)
 Pomadasys macracanthus (Günther, 1864) (Longspine grunt)
 Pomadasys maculatus (Bloch, 1793) (Saddle grunt)
 Pomadasys multimaculatus (Playfair (fr), 1867) (Cock grunter)
 Pomadasys olivaceus (F. Day, 1875) (Olive grunt)
 Pomadasys panamensis (Steindachner, 1876) (Panama grunt)
 Pomadasys perotaei (G. Cuvier, 1830) (Parrot grunt)
 Pomadasys punctulatus (Rüppell, 1838) (Lined grunt)
 Pomadasys quadrilineatus S. C. Shen & W. W. Lin, 1984 (Yellow-lined grunter)
 Pomadasys ramosus (Poey, 1860)
 Pomadasys rogerii (G. Cuvier, 1830) (Pigsnout grunt)
 Pomadasys schyrii Steindachner, 1900
 Pomadasys striatus (Gilchrist & W. W. Thompson, 1908) (Striped grunter)
 Pomadasys stridens (Forsskål, 1775) (Striped piggy)
 Pomadasys suillus (Valenciennes, 1833)
 Pomadasys taeniatus McKay & J. E. Randall, 1995 (Bronzestriped grunt)
 Pomadasys trifasciatus Fowler, 1937 (Black-ear javelin)
 Pomadasys unimaculatus M. C. Tian, 1982 (Red patched grunter)

Systematics
Pomadasys has been subject to some molecular studies which have resolved the genus as paraphyletic. To resolve this paraphyly the genera Rhencus and Rhonciscus were revived with the eastern Pacific species P. maacrocanthus and P. panamensis being placed in Rhencus while Rhonicus contains the eastern Pacific species P. bayanus and the western Atlantic species P. crocro.

References

Haemulinae